Hassan Rachidi is a Moroccan journalist and director of Al Jazeera in Morocco.

Born July 6, 1957 b Meknes after a university Faculty of Law in Rabat b dabble in the written press and the movement across multiple platforms, including: the Green March and the National Charter.

In June 1980, he was the first journalist to join the Moroccan radio midi 1 B Tangier was to leave for Radio Netherlands in 1990 where he worked as editor and then moved to television in May 1994 by Orbit Rome, where he worked as director of programs prior to joining with Abu Dhabi TV, and then to an Al Jazeera journalist joined the team before eleven years.

He knew Rashidi Hassan Al-Jazeera producer to tell then a war correspondent who has covered several wars in Somalia, Eritrea, Ethiopia, Sierra Leone and the Democratic Republic of Afghanistan and Iraq and was appointed director of the regional office in Morocco 25 December 2003. Oversaw the Maghreb bulletin broadcast from Rabat and follow-up has been prosecuted on the back cover Al-Jazeera to the events of the town of Sidi Ifni.

Moroccan authorities arrested Hassan Rachidi and pulled his license for press publication of alleged false news on the back cover the events in Sidi Ifni, which occurred on June 7, 2008.

References

Al Jazeera people
Moroccan male journalists
People from Meknes
1957 births
Living people
Mohammed V University alumni